FF DIN is a sans-serif typeface in the industrial or "grotesque" style. It was designed in 1995 by Albert-Jan Pool, based on DIN-Mittelschrift and DIN-Engschrift, as defined in the German standard DIN 1451. DIN is an acronym for Deutsches Institut für Normung (German Institute of Standardisation). It was published by FontShop in its FontFont library of typefaces.

FF DIN has an unadorned appearance with high x-height and a large series of weights. It became very popular: , it remained the best-selling typeface on MyFonts.

History
At a 1994 meeting of the Association Typographique Internationale trade association in San Francisco, Pool encountered Erik Spiekermann, who encouraged him to design a revival of DIN 1451 for release by FontFont, the type foundry Spiekermann had just established.

While based on the DIN 1451 standard lettering, FF DIN has additional weights and a far wider character set. It includes ranging (old style) figures and several refinements that allow it to perform better as a print and screen text face. Spiekermann wrote in 2009 that "Albert’s brief was to take the regular weight and subtly make it a good typeface. He did it so well that it looks exactly like the original, but much better, especially in smaller sizes. Albert also added weights...FF DIN looks as if DIN had always had those weights because Albert didn’t let his ego interfere with the job."

The family includes five font weights in two widths, normal and condensed, each with italics. The entire family includes extended characters such as arrows, fractions, euro sign, lozenge, mathematical symbols, extra accented Latin letters, and superscript numeral figures. Alternate glyphs include rounded dots, old style figures, and alternate cedilla. With time Eastern European, Greek and Cyrillic character sets have been added as well.

Distinctive characteristics
 Square dot with extra whitespace above the lower case i
 Rounded/extended shoulder of the lower case r
 Straight leg of the uppercase R
 Straight spur of the lower case a
 The geometric apostrophe with the bottom slant
 Lower-case L with a curl
 Slanted form is an oblique, rather than a true italic.
 Alternate characters: single-storey italic 'a', round dots.

FF DIN Round
In summer 2010, FontFont introduced a completely new drawn round version called FF DIN Round, including five weights: light, regular, medium, bold, black. Assisted by Ivo Gabrowitsch of FontShop International, Albert-Jan Pool wrote a brochure named FF DIN Round – digital block letters. It provides additional information on both the design and the history of round sans serif typefaces. FF DIN Round Pro also includes a Cyrillic character set for all weights.

Popular usage outside of Germany
 The New York City Ballet logo uses FF DIN.
 Identity of the 2008 London Design Festival.
 FF DIN Condensed was formerly used as webfonts throughout the technology news site The Verge.
 Posters for the film The Wolf of Wall Street use FF DIN.
 The Swiss university ETH Zurich uses FF DIN Pro for posters, brochures and leaflets.
 jetBlue Airways uses FF DIN Bold for its logo and corporate materials.
 CBS Sports uses FF DIN as the typeface for television chyrons and scorekeeping.
 International Aerobatic Club uses FF DIN as the typeface for logos and branding.
 LA Metro uses FF DIN for their buses, bus stops and logo.
 The logotype for Steam uses FF DIN OT Bold.
 The logotype used for Half-Life (series).

References

Blackwell, Lewis. 20th Century Type. Yale University Press: 2004. .
Fiedl, Frederich, Nicholas Ott and Bernard Stein. Typography: An Encyclopedic Survey of Type Design and Techniques Through History. Black Dog & Leventhal: 1998. .
Macmillan, Neil. An A–Z of Type Designers. Yale University Press: 2006. .
Spiekermann, Erik; Middendorp, Jan: Made with FontFont, Book Industry Services (BIS): 2006, 
DIN 1451-2: Schriften–Serifenlose Linear-Antiqua–Verkehrsschrift. Deutsches Institut für Normung, 1986-2002.
ACLU Identity Guidelines

External links
 FontShop International’s FF DIN typeface
 FF DIN weights overview and in use examples
 FontFeed: Introduction of FF DIN Round
 FF DIN Family History
 Fonts in Use
 Albert-Jan Pool on Flickr (includes many examples of DIN and DIN-style lettering)

DIN
DIN
Typefaces with text figures
Typefaces and fonts introduced in 1995